Franz Jevne State Park is a state park of Minnesota, USA. It is located on the Rainy River (which demarks the Canada–United States border) between International Falls and Baudette in Koochiching County.

Mammalian species of beaver, timber wolf, and moose roam in this park. Many birds are found along the Rainy River by visitors such as various songbirds, woodpeckers, pelicans, and bald eagles.

The land for the  park was donated to the state by the Franz Jevne family; the park was created in 1967 by the Minnesota Legislature. By area, it is the smallest of Minnesota's state parks.

References

External links
 Franz Jevne State Park

1967 establishments in Minnesota
Protected areas established in 1967
Protected areas of Koochiching County, Minnesota
State parks of Minnesota